Adam Vojtěch (born 2 October 1986) is a Czech politician and lawyer who served as Minister of Health from 13 December 2017 to 21 September 2020, in both the first and second cabinets of Prime Minister Andrej Babiš, and then for a second time from May until December 2021. He was a member of the Chamber of Deputies from 2017 until 2021.

Early life and education
In 2005, Vojtěch reached the semi-finals of Česko hledá SuperStar, the Czech version of the Idol series.

Vojtěch graduated from the Faculty of Social Studies of Charles University in Prague in 2009, with a degree in Media and Communication Studies. After a period of study at University College Dublin in Ireland, he returned to study at Charles University's Faculty of Law, and again at the Faculty of Social Sciences. Since 2017 he has been associated with the university's First Faculty of Medicine.

Career
Vojtěch was Head of the Všehrd Lawyers' Association from 2010–12, before working as a lawyer for Mafra, the media group that is a subsidiary of Babiš' Agrofert business empire. From 2014 to 2017 Vojtěch worked as Babiš' private secretary while he was Minister of Finance. He was elected to the Chamber of Deputies in October 2017, and appointed Minister of Health. In September 2020, during a rapid increase in the number of coronavirus cases in the country, Vojtěch resigned as Minister of Health. 

After the resignation of Petr Arenberger in May 2021, Vojtěch was appointed Minister of Health for a second time.

References

1986 births
Living people
Health ministers of the Czech Republic
21st-century Czech lawyers
ANO 2011 Government ministers
Charles University alumni
Politicians from České Budějovice
Civic Democratic Party (Czech Republic) politicians
Members of the Chamber of Deputies of the Czech Republic (2017–2021)
Ambassadors of the Czech Republic to Finland